Elaphrinae is a subfamily of ground beetles in the family Carabidae. There are at least 4 genera and more than 50 described species in Elaphrinae.

Genera
These four genera belong to the subfamily Elaphrinae:
 Blethisa Bonelli, 1810
 Diacheila Motschulsky, 1844
 Elaphrus Fabricius, 1775
 † Elaphrotites Haupt, 1856

References

 
Carabidae subfamilies